Henry Campbell Bruce, 2nd Baron Aberdare  (19 June 1851 – 20 February 1929), styled The Honourable from 1873 to 1895, was a British soldier and peer.

Background
Bruce was the eldest son of Henry Bruce, 1st Baron Aberdare, who had served as Home Secretary. His mother Annabella was his father's first wife and the daughter of Richard Beadon. He was educated at Rugby School and at the Friedrich Wilhelm University in Berlin. In 1895, he succeeded his father as baron.

Career
His military career, by virtue of his status in the nobility, was started early: he served in the Welch Regiment and became a major of the 3rd Battalion in 1899. A year later he was appointed its honorary lieutenant-colonel and in 1910 honorary colonel of the 5th Battalion. Later Bruce was promoted to lieutenant colonel of the 3rd Battalion. He was decorated with the Volunteer Decoration.

Bruce was president of University College as well as of the National Museum Wales. He was a Justice of the Peace, assigned to Glamorgan and represented the county first as Deputy Lieutenant from December 1901, later as Vice Lord Lieutenant.

Family

He married Constance Mary, daughter of Hamilton Beckett on 10 February 1880. The couple had nine children together, five sons and four daughters.
 Henry Lyndhurst Bruce (25 May 1881 – 14 December 1914), m. 1906 Camille Clifford
 Margaret Cecilia Bruce, m. 1904 Orlando Bridgeman, 5th Earl of Bradford
 Clarence Bruce, 3rd Baron Aberdare (born 2 August 1885) m. 1912 Margaret Bethune Black, m. 1957 Griselda Harriet Violet Finetta Georgina Hervey
 Violet Bruce
 John Hamilton Bruce (born 14 June 1889)
 Eva Isabel Marion Bruce, m. 1911 Algernon Strutt, 3rd Baron Belper, m. 1924 Harry Primrose, 6th Earl of Rosebery
 Constance Pamela Alice Bruce, m. 1919 Edward Digby, 11th Baron Digby
 Victor Austin Bruce (born 8 April 1897 – 1978) m. 1926 Mildred Mary Petre, known as Mrs Victor Bruce (10 November 1895 – 21 May 1990) record-breaking racing motorist, speedboat racer and aviator.
 Robert Bruce

His oldest son and heir apparent Henry was commissioned a captain in the 3rd Battalion, Royal Scots, but was killed in action soon after the First World War broke out. Bruce died himself in 1929 and was succeeded in the barony by his second son Clarence.
His granddaughter, Pamela Digby, became American Ambassador to France.

Notes

References

External links
 
 
 

1851 births
1929 deaths
Deputy Lieutenants of Glamorgan
Humboldt University of Berlin alumni
People educated at Rugby School
Welch Regiment officers
Eldest sons of British hereditary barons
Henry 2